João Almino is a Brazilian novelist. He is the author of The Brasília Quintet, which consists of the novels Ideas on Where to Spend the End of the World, Samba-Enredo, The Five Seasons of Love (first published in Portuguese by Editora Record; published in Spanish by Alfaguara, México, and by Corregidor, in Argentina; in Italian by Editrice Il Sirente; Casa de las Americas 2003 Literary Award; in English by Host Publications, 2008); The Book of Emotions (shortlisted for the Zaffari & Bourbon Literary Award and the Portugal-Telecom Literary Award; Editora Record, 2008; Dalkey Archive Press, 2012) and Cidade Livre (Free City, Editora Record, 2010; Passo Fundo Zaffari & Bourbon Literary Award for best novel published in Portuguese from May 2009 to May 2011; shortlisted for the Jabuti Award 2011 and for the Portugal-Telecom Literary Award 2011; translated as Free City, it was published by Dalkey Archive Press in 2013). His 2015 novelEnigmas da Primavera (Enigmas of Spring) was published in English in 2016 by Dalkey Archive Press and won the Jabuti Award (second Prize) for Best Brazilian Book in translation. His seventh novel was published in November 2017 in Brazil: Entre facas, algodão (The last twist of the knife, Dalkey Archive Press, 2021). His most recent novel, Homem de Papel, was published in 2022. He has also authored books of philosophical and literary essays. He taught at the National Autonomous University of Mexico (UNAM), at the University of Brasília (UnB), the Instituto Rio Branco, Berkeley, Stanford and The University of Chicago. In 2017, he was elected as one of the 40 members of the Brazilian Academy of Letters.

Bibliography

Fiction 
Idéias para Onde Passar o Fim do Mundo, Brasiliense, 1987 (reedição 2003)
Samba-Enredo, 1994; republished by Editora Record in 2013 (also published in Spanish)
As Cinco Estações do Amor, 2001; (also published in Spanish, in Italian and in English)
O Livro das Emoções, 2008; The Book of Emotions, Dalkey Archive Press, 2012.
Cidade Livre, Editora Record, 2010; "Hôtel Brasilia", Editions Métailié, Paris, 2012; Free City, Dalkey Archive Press, 2013.
 These books are part of what is known as the "Brasília'Quintet" Quinteto de Brasília.
Enigmas da Primavera (Enigmas of Spring, Dalkey Archive Press, 2016), Editora Record, 2015.
Entre facas, algodão (The last twist of the knife, Editora Record, 2017.
Homem de Papel  Editora Record, 2022.

Literary Essays 
Brasil-EUA: Balanço Poético, 1996;
Escrita em contraponto, 2008; Tendencias de la Literatura Brasileña, Buenos Aires: Leviatán, 2012;
O diabrete angélico e o pavão: Enredo e amor possíveis em Brás Cubas, 2009.

Other books 
Os Democratas Autoritários, 1980;
A Idade do Presente, 1985 ("La edad del presente", Fondo de Cultura Económica, México, 1986);
Era uma Vez uma Constituinte, 1985;
O Segredo e a Informação, 1986;
Naturezas Mortas - A Filosofia Política do Ecologismo, 2004.
500 anos de Utopia, 2017.
Dois ensaios sobre Utopia, 2017.

Awards

1988 
 Shortlisted Prêmio Jabuti, por Idéias para Onde Passar o Fim do Mundo
 Instituto Nacional do Livro,  Idéias para Onde Passar o Fim do Mundo
 Candango de Literatura, for Idéias para Onde Passar o Fim do Mundo

2003  
 Casa de las Américas Award, Cuba, for "The Five Seasons of Love", As Cinco Estações do Amor

2009  
 nominated for the Portugal-Telecom Award, "O Livro das Emoções" ("The Book of Emotions");
 nominated for the 6th Prêmio Passo Fundo Zaffari & Bourbon de Literatura (Biannual Passo Fundo Zaffari & Bourbon for best novel, O Livro das Emoções ("The Book of Emotions");

2011  
 winner of the 7º Prêmio Passo Fundo Zaffari & Bourbon de Literatura (7th Passo Fundo Literary Biannual Zaffari & Bourbon Award as best novel, for Cidade Livre, "Free City");
 shortlisted for the Prêmio Jabuti, Cidade Livre ("Free City");
 shortlisted for the Portugal-Telecom Award, Cidade Livre ("Free City");

2014  
 nominee for the International IMPAC Dublin Literary Award, The Book of Emotions ("O livro das emoções").

2015  
 nominee for the International IMPAC Dublin Literary Award, Free City ("Cidade Livre").

2016 
 shortlisted for the Rio Literature Award, Enigmas da Primavera (Enigmas of Spring, Dalkey Archive Press)
 shortlisted for the São Paulo Prize for Literature, Enigmas da Primavera (Enigmas of Spring, Dalkey Archive Press) Semifinalist for the Oceanos Award, Enigmas da Primavera (Enigmas of Spring, Dalkey Archive Press).

2017  
 Jabuti Award, 2nd Prize, for Enigmas of Spring, published by Dalkey Archive Press.

2017  
 Semifinalist for the Oceanos Award, for Entre facas, algodão (The last twist of the knife).

References

External links
João Almino
List of books by the author from WorldCat
Overview - works in libraries (Worldcat catalogue)
The Book of Emotions, Lusofonia and its futures
The Book of Emotions BOOKFORUM
The Book of Emotions, Full Stop
Exploring fictions, Excerpt “The Five Seasons of Love”
Host Publications, The Five Seasons of Love
Le Monde
Hôtel Brasilia, Le Figaro Littéraire
Critique, Articles de Presse, France, Hôtel Brasilia
Regina Zilberman, Cidade Livre: Fundação e memória cultural
Almino y la inquieta literatura brasileña
Guillermo Lescano Allende, "Dios no piensa en números redondos"
Heloisa Buarque de Hollanda sobre “As Cinco Estações do Amor”
Estudos Lusófonos, Um dedo de prosa com João Almino
Todo instante: a ficção de João Almino, por Pedro Meira Monteiro
Saraiva Conteúdo
Cidade Livre, Correio Braziliense
Moacyr Scliar sobre “O livro das emoções”
Alvaro Costa e Silva e Eustáquio Gomes sobre “Cidade Livre”
João Almino in Facebook

20th-century Brazilian novelists
20th-century Brazilian male writers
Brazilian male novelists
Living people
Academic staff of the National Autonomous University of Mexico
Stanford University faculty
Year of birth missing (living people)
21st-century Brazilian novelists
21st-century Brazilian male writers